The 2006–07 UCLA Bruins men's basketball team represented the University of California, Los Angeles in the 2006–07 NCAA Division I men's basketball season.  The Bruins finished first in the Pacific-10 Conference standings.  The team reached the Final Four in the 2007 NCAA Division I men's basketball tournament for the second year in a row, losing to the Florida Gators.

Recruiting class

Roster

Schedule

|-
!colspan=9 style=|Exhibition

|-
!colspan=9 style=|Regular Season

|-
!colspan=12 style="background:#;"| Pac-10 Tournament

|-
!colspan=12 style="background:#;"| NCAA tournament

Source

See also
2007 Pacific-10 Conference men's basketball tournament
2007 NCAA Division I men's basketball tournament
2006–07 NCAA Division I men's basketball season

References 

UCLA Bruins men's basketball
UCLA Bruins men's basketball seasons
NCAA Division I men's basketball tournament Final Four seasons
UCLA Bruins men's basketball
UCLA Bruins men's basketball
UCLA Bruins men's basketball